J. T. Rodgers was a member of the Arkansas House of Representatives in 1893. He was a white Democrat and served with two African Americans who also represented Jefferson County, Arkansas in the House that year, P. H. Booth and Howard McKay.

References

Arkansas Democrats
Politicians from Jefferson County, Arkansas

Year of birth missing (living people)